The Albert M. and Alice Bellack House is a historic house located in Columbus, Wisconsin. It was added to the National Register of Historic Places on June 7, 2010.

Description and history
The -story house was designed in the Queen Anne style and built for Albert and Alice Bellack in 1897. From 1920 to 1923, the house underwent extensive renovations which expanded its size and introduced the Mission architecture style to it.

References

Houses in Columbia County, Wisconsin
Houses completed in 1897
Houses on the National Register of Historic Places in Wisconsin
Mission Revival architecture in Wisconsin
Queen Anne architecture in Wisconsin
Columbus, Wisconsin
National Register of Historic Places in Columbia County, Wisconsin